Pál Kovács (17 July 1912 – 8 July 1995) was a Hungarian athlete, who began as a hurdler, but eventually switched to fencing.

By the time Kovács won his first fencing gold, in 1936, he had already been a member of the winning Hungarian team at the 1933 World Championships. The Hungarians won team sabre gold in five successive Olympics, lasting from 1936 until 1960. The same team won gold eight back-to-back world championships (including the two Olympics, which double as world championships in their respective years). Kovács also won individual gold in 1952, as well as individual bronze in 1948. In 1980, he became vice-president of the Fédération Internationale d'Escrime. He died in Budapest in July 1995.

See also
List of multiple Olympic gold medalists in one event
List of multiple Olympic gold medalists

References

1912 births
1995 deaths
Hungarian male hurdlers
Hungarian male sabre fencers
Olympic fencers of Hungary
Fencers at the 1936 Summer Olympics
Fencers at the 1948 Summer Olympics
Fencers at the 1952 Summer Olympics
Fencers at the 1956 Summer Olympics
Fencers at the 1960 Summer Olympics
Olympic gold medalists for Hungary
Olympic bronze medalists for Hungary
Olympic medalists in fencing
Medalists at the 1936 Summer Olympics
Medalists at the 1948 Summer Olympics
Medalists at the 1952 Summer Olympics
Medalists at the 1956 Summer Olympics
Medalists at the 1960 Summer Olympics
Sportspeople from Debrecen